Culture and Arts Center station is a subway station in Yuelu District, Changsha, Hunan, China, operated by the Changsha subway operator Changsha Metro. It entered revenue service on December 28, 2015.

History
The station opened on 28 December 2015.

Layout

Surrounding area
 Entrance No. 1 and No. 2: International Culture and Arts Center of Meixi Lake
 Entrance No. 4: Meilifang, Zhenyecheng

References

Railway stations in Hunan
Railway stations in China opened in 2015